Bishop John Quinlan (October 19, 1826, Cloyne, County Cork, Ireland – March 9, 1883, Alabama) was a Catholic bishop and the second Bishop of Mobile.

Biography

Early life 
John Quinlan was born on 19 October 1826 in Cloyne, Ireland, and immigrated to the United States when he was 18, in 1844. He was accepted as a seminarian for the Archdiocese of Cincinnati by John Baptist Purcell, and sent to Mount St. Mary's University for studies. On August 30, 1852, he was ordained a priest by bishop Purcell.

Priesthood 
Quinlan's first assignment as a priest was in Piqua, Ohio, before serving as curate for future Archbishop of Philadelphia James Wood at St. Patrick's Church in Cincinnati. Following this, he served as rector of Mount Saint Marys of the West before being appointed the second bishop of the Diocese of Mobile on August 19, 1859, and consecrated a bishop by Antoine Blanc on December 4 of that same year.

Episcopacy 
In his diocese he found twelve churches and fourteen schools for which he had only eight secular priests and he therefore brought from Ireland eleven young candidates for the priesthood. Bishop Quinlan's administration fell upon the storm days of the American Civil War. After the battle of Shiloh, he hastened on a special train to the blood-stained battle-ground and ministered to the temporal and spiritual wants of North and South.

After the war diocesan activities were crippled. Nevertheless, besides repairing ruined churches, Bishop Quinlan built the portico of the Mobile cathedral, founded St. Patrick's and St. Mary's churches in the same city, and established churches in Huntsville, Decatur, Tuscumbia, Florence, Cullman, Birmingham, Eufaula, Whistler, and Toulminville.

In April 1876, Bishop Quinlan invited the Benedictines from St. Vincent's Abbey, Pennsylvania to the diocese, and they settled at Cullman, Alabama.

He died March 9, 1883, and is entombed under the portico of the Cathedral Basilica of the Immaculate Conception in Mobile, Alabama.

Quinlan Hall, on the campus of Spring Hill College, is named in his honor.

References

External links
 Catholic Encyclopedia bio

Episcopal succession

Roman Catholic bishops of Mobile
Irish emigrants to the United States (before 1923)
Roman Catholic Archdiocese of Cincinnati
19th-century Roman Catholic bishops in the United States
1826 births
1883 deaths
Place of death missing